This is a list of Kazakh football transfers in the winter transfer window 2014 by club. Only clubs of the 2014 Kazakhstan Premier League are included.

Kazakhstan Premier League 2014

Aktobe

In:

Out:

Astana

In:

Out:

Atyrau

In:

Out:

Irtysh

In:

Out:

Kairat

Winter

In:

 

Out:

Kaisar

In:

Out:

Ordabasy

In:

Out:

Shakhter Karagandy

In:

Out:

Spartak Semey

In:

 

Out:

Taraz

In:

Out:

Tobol

In:

Out:

Zhetysu

In:

Out:

References

Kazakhstan
2013–14
Transfers